The 2011 LDB was the first edition of Liga de Desenvolvimento de Basquete, the Under-22 Brazilian basketball league. It received support from the Federal Government to be realized and was a great success. The champion was Flamengo.

LDB is organized according to the rules of FIBA for international competitions: the participating teams are divided into groups of 8 teams each. The teams in each group play against each other, and the three best teams from each group qualify to advance to the next phase, which is a 6 team group stage. The top four teams of that group then advance to the Final Four. The best team of the Final Four is crowned the champion.

Participating teams

First phase

Group A
{| class="wikitable" style="text-align: center;"
! width=20| # !! width=180|Teams !! width=20| !! width=20| !! width=20| !! width=35| !! width=35| !! width=35| !! width=35| !! width=35| !! Qualification or relegation
|- bgcolor=ACE1AF
|1||align="left"|Flamengo || 7 || 7 || 0 || 615 || 406 || 1,52 || 100% || 14
|rowspan=3 align="center"|Qualified for the Semifinal
|- bgcolor=ACE1AF
|2||align="left"|Paulistano || 7 || 6 || 1 || 531 || 451 || 1,18 || 85,71% || 13
|- bgcolor=ACE1AF
|3||align="left"|Franca || 7 || 4 || 3 || 462 || 438 || 1,06 || 57,14% || 11
|-
|4||align="left"|Joinville || 7 || 4 || 3 || 516 || 436 || 1,18 || 57,71% || 11
|-
|5||align="left"|Pinheiros || 7 || 4 || 3 || 563 || 525 || 1,07 || 57,71% || 11
|-
|6||align="left"|Limeira || 7 || 2 || 5 || 435 || 465 || 0,94 || 28,57% || 9
|-
|7||align="left"|Tijuca || 7 || 1 || 6 || 409 || 563 || 0,73 || 14,29% || 8
|-
|8||align="left"|Araraquara || 7 || 0 || 7 || 321 || 568 || 0,57 || 0% || 7
|-

Group B
{| class="wikitable" style="text-align: center;"
! width=20| # !! width=180|Teams !! width=20| !! width=20| !! width=20| !! width=35| !! width=35| !! width=35| !! width=35| !! width=35| !! Qualification or relegation
|- bgcolor=ACE1AF
|1||align="left"|Bauru || 7 || 7 || 0 || 573|| 318 || 1,80 || 100% || 14
|rowspan=3 align="center"|Qualified for the Semifinal
|- bgcolor=ACE1AF
|2||align="left"|Minas || 7 || 5 || 2 || 476 || 369 || 1,29 || 71,43% || 12
|- bgcolor=ACE1AF
|3||align="left"|Brasília || 7 || 5 || 2 || 447 || 354 || 1,26 || 71,43% || 12
|-
|4||align="left"|Uberlândia || 7 || 4 || 3 || 447 || 458 || 0,98 || 57,71% || 11
|-
|5||align="left"|Vila Velha || 7 || 3 || 4 || 421 || 474 || 0,89 || 42,86% || 10
|-
|6||align="left"|São José || 7 || 3 || 4 || 430 || 467 || 0,92 || 42,86% || 10
|-
|7||align="left"|Vitória || 7 || 1 || 6 || 369 || 487 || 0,76 || 14,29% || 8
|-
|8||align="left"|Liga Sorocabana || 7 || 0 || 7 || 332 || 568 || 0,59 || 0% || 7
|-

Semifinal
{| class="wikitable" style="text-align: center;"
! width=20| # !! width=180|Teams !! width=20| !! width=20| !! width=20| !! width=35| !! width=35| !! width=35| !! width=35| !! width=35| !! Qualification or relegation
|- bgcolor=ACE1AF
|1||align="left"|Flamengo || 5 || 4 || 1 || 281|| 221 || 1,27 || 80% || 9
|rowspan=4 align="center"|Qualified for the Final Four
|- bgcolor=ACE1AF
|2||align="left"|Bauru || 5 || 3 || 2 || 315 || 272 || 1,16 || 60% || 8
|- bgcolor=ACE1AF
|3||align="left"|Brasília || 5 || 3 || 2 || 281 || 293 || 0,96 || 60% || 8
|- bgcolor=ACE1AF
|4||align="left"|Paulistano || 5 || 2 || 3 || 297 || 328 || 0,91 || 40% || 7
|-
|5||align="left"|Franca || 5 || 2 || 3 || 233 || 320 || 0,73 || 40% || 7
|-
|6||align="left"|Minas || 5 || 1 || 4 || 258 || 231 || 1,12 || 20% || 6
|-

Final four
{| class="wikitable" style="text-align: center;"
! width=20| # !! width=180|Teams !! width=20| !! width=20| !! width=20| !! width=35| !! width=35| !! width=35| !! width=35| !! width=35| !! Qualification or relegation
|- bgcolor=ACE1AF
|1||align="left"|Flamengo || 3 || 3 || 0 || 205|| 189 || 1,09 || 100% || 9
|rowspan=1 align="center"|LDB Champion
|-
|2||align="left"|Bauru || 3 || 2 || 1 || 203 || 179 || 1,13 || 67% || 8
|-
|3||align="left"|Paulistano || 3 || 1 || 2 || 191 || 184 || 1,04 || 33% || 8
|-
|4||align="left"|Brasília || 3 || 0 || 3 || 160 || 207 || 0,77 || 0% || 7
|-

Honors
 MVP : Fred Duarte (Flamengo)
 More Assists : Gegê (Flamengo)
 The Most Efficient Player : Fred Duarte (Flamengo)
 More Rebounds : Fred Duarte (Flamengo)

External links
Official website 

LDB